The Stanley letter is a letter written in 1831 by Edward Stanley (who later became  The 14th Earl of Derby), then Chief Secretary for Ireland. The letter outlined his proposal which helped the U.K. Government to establish legal basis for national schools in Ireland. It was written two years after the government led by The Duke of Wellington, in alliance with Daniel O'Connell, secured the passage and Royal Proclamation of the Catholic Emancipation bill. It was penned by the Chief Secretary for Ireland, Edward Stanley (later Prime Minister of the United Kingdom as The 14th Earl of Derby) and was addressed to the 3rd Duke of Leinster.

Proposal
The proposal in the Stanley letter was considered a policy experiment. As one commentator put it, "Ireland, as a colony could be used as an experimental milieu for social legislation which might not be tolerated in England where laissez-faire politico-economic policies were more rigid and doctrinaire." This was also true of other Irish initiatives involving the police force and health services. Stanley's framework involved the establishment of "a board for the superintendence of a system of national education" integrating key measures and educational conventions in place in Ireland such as the state-supported, mass system  foundered on the denominational issue.

Results
In line with the letter's suggestions, a Board of Commission of National Education was established which disbursed funds for school building and the hiring of teachers and inspectors and which provided grants for schools. The Board tried to mix Catholic and Protestant students by favouring applications for 'mixed' schools.  However, in the years after the 1830s, different religious denominations begin to apply separately for control of schools. Even in 2010 approximately 1 percent of Irish schools (34 out of 3,279) are not under the control of a religious organization, with the remaining 99 percent under religious control.

The new policy was credited for spreading literacy, especially to the poor communities. By 1831, the national schools based on Stanley's model has enrolled more than 100,000 children, a figure that increased to almost 1 million within 40 years. Teacher training was also enhanced. For example, the paid monitors, the lowest grade teachers, were evaluated annually using the instructional materials used in schools.

Current status
The Stanley letter remains today the legal basis for all national schools in the Republic of Ireland, the predominant form of primary education in the country.

References

 The Letter was recently published in the book "We Declare - Landmark Documents in Ireland's History", Richard Aldous and Niamh Puirseil, 2008, Quercus, 
 The text of the letter is online at 

History of education in Ireland